= Kent University =

Kent University may refer to:

- University of Kent (formerly the University of Kent at Canterbury) in the United Kingdom
- Kent State University, Ohio, United States
